Lucivaldo Lázaro de Abreu (born August 22, 1983 in Natal), known as Val, is a Brazilian footballer who plays as midfielder for Centro Esportivo Força e Luz.

Career statistics

Honours 
 Flamengo
 Copa do Brasil: 2013

 América de Natal
 Campeonato Potiguar: 2014

 Botafogo da Paraíba
 Campeonato Paraibano: 2017

References

External links

1983 births
People from Natal, Rio Grande do Norte
Living people
Brazilian footballers
Association football midfielders
Campeonato Brasileiro Série A players
Campeonato Brasileiro Série B players
Campeonato Brasileiro Série C players
Campeonato Brasileiro Série D players
Mogi Mirim Esporte Clube players
CR Flamengo footballers
Botafogo Futebol Clube (PB) players
América Futebol Clube (RN) players
Esporte Clube Bahia players
Alecrim Futebol Clube players
Clube Atlético do Porto players
Sportspeople from Rio Grande do Norte